Chad C. Brown (born December 18, 1978) is an American Thoroughbred horse racing trainer known for his expertise with turf horses and with fillies and mares. He has trained ten Eclipse Award winners including Stacelita, Big Blue Kitten, Lady Eli, Flintshire, and Horse of the Year Bricks and Mortar. After receiving the Eclipse Award for Outstanding Trainer of 2016, he won his first Triple Crown race with Cloud Computing in the 2017 Preakness Stakes. He also won the Eclipse Award in 2017, 2018, and 2019.

Background
Brown was born and raised in Mechanicville, a small city in upstate New York, and became interested in horses at an early age during family visits to nearby Saratoga race track. While in high school, he worked with Standardbreds at Saratoga Raceway. While studying animal science at Cornell University, he had a summer job with Hall of Fame trainer Shug McGaughey. After graduation, Brown stayed with McGaughey for some time, then obtained an internship with veterinarian Steve Allday.

Training career
Brown went to work as an assistant to Hall of Fame trainer Robert Frankel in 2002.  Brown came to national attention at the time of the 2007 Breeders' Cup, when Frankel returned to California to attend to his sick dog and Brown stepped in to take his place, saddling Ginger Punch to a win in the Breeders' Cup Distaff.

In November 2007, Brown went out on his own with only ten horses in his stable, five provided by Ken and Sarah Ramsey and the other five by Gary and Mary West. He won with his second starter, Dual Jewels, on November 23, but the horse was claimed, reducing the stable to nine. He then went to Oaklawn Park for the winter meet, before moving to Keeneland where he scored his second win.

After initially being turned down for stall space, Brown competed in his first Saratoga Race Course meet in 2008, and the first horse he entered, Star Player, won the first race on opening day. Brown would win 6 races from 18 starters at the meet, including the debut of the two-year-old filly Maram. She then went on to win the Miss Grillo Stakes (Grade 3) at Belmont Park, which was Brown's first graded stakes win as a trainer. The win also earned Maram a spot in the Breeders' Cup Juvenile Fillies Turf at Santa Anita Park, where she defeated a competitive field at odds of 11–1 to earn Brown his first Breeders' Cup victory, with a purse of over $1,000,000. Earlier in the day, Brown's grandfather, Elmer Maynard, had been buried in his hometown of Mechanicville. Brown said, "I couldn't be there, and I knew it meant we were going to win."

In 2011, Brown took over the training of Stacelita, who was originally based in Europe. Under his care, she won the Beverly D. and Flower Bowl Invitational on her way to winning the Eclipse Award for champion turf female. Brown also had the French-bred mare Zagora transferred to his barn, who would go on to win several major stakes including the 2012 Breeders' Cup Filly and Mare Turf. She would become the second Eclipse winner trained by Brown when named 2012 champion turf female.

In 2013, Brown ranked third among North American trainers by earnings. The highlights included wins by Big Blue Kitten in the Sword Dancer Invitational and United Nations Handicap, and Real Solution in the Arlington Million.

In 2014, Brown won three Breeders Cup races; Lady Eli in the Breeders' Cup Juvenile Fillies Turf, Dayatthespa in the Filly and Mare Turf, and Bobby's Kitten in the Turf Sprint. He was also an Eclipse Award finalist for outstanding trainer. Dayatthespa was named champion turf female.

At the 2015 Breeders' Cup, Brown earned wins with both Stephanie's Kitten in the Filly and Mare Turf, and Wavell Avenue in the Filly and Mare Sprint. He also trained Big Blue Kitten to several victories including the Joe Hirsch Turf Classic, in which he set a course record, as well as a close second-place finish in the Arlington Million and a third in the Breeders' Cup Turf. Big Blue Kitten's consistency would earn him the Eclipse Award for champion turf male.

In 2016, Brown took over the training of Juddmonte Farm's Flintshire, who had previously campaigned internationally for André Fabre. In his first start with Brown, Flintshire won the Manhattan Handicap. The win helped Brown earn the trainer title for the Belmont spring/summer meet. On August 24, Brown earned his 1,000th career win with Mr Maybe at Saratoga. He went on to take the trainers title at Saratoga with a record 40 wins, capped by a victory by Practical Joke in the Hopeful Stakes, his first graded stakes victory on the dirt at Saratoga. He was the leading trainer in America by earnings and number of graded stakes wins, earning him the Eclipse Award for Outstanding Trainer.

Brown won his first Triple Crown race with Cloud Computing in the 2017 Preakness Stakes. Later in the year, he won the Breeders' Cup Juvenile with Good Magic, who was named Champion two-year-old colt. Brown earned his second Eclipse Award in 2017 after his trainees won 16 Grade I races and earned over $26 million in purse money.

In 2019, Brown's stable set a North American record with $31,112,144 in earnings. He won three more Breeders Cup races to bring his career total to fifteen and 3rd all-time among trainers. He received his fourth consecutive Eclipse Award for Outstanding Trainer.

Personal life
On August 17, 2022, Chad Brown was arrested by the Saratoga Springs Police Department on a misdemeanor charge of criminal obstruction of breathing. According to prosecutors, Brown pushed a woman down a flight of stairs in his home and attempted to choke her. Brown's attorney claimed that the woman broke into the house and that Brown acted in self-defense. The case was closed in November 2022 after Brown accepted a plea bargain for a lesser violation which carried a fine and a one-year conditional discharge.

Year-end rankings

References

 Chad Brown at the NTRA

1978 births
American horse trainers
People from Saratoga, New York
Living people
Cornell University College of Agriculture and Life Sciences alumni
Eclipse Award winners